Anos may refer to the following places:

 Anos, Pyrénées-Atlantiques, France
 Anos, Russia
 Anos, Spain
 Verkh-Anos, Altai Republic, Russia

See also
Because anos and años mean "years" in Portuguese and Spanish respectively, these words appear in countless toponyms and titles: